Sean Huang (born 19 June 1991) is a Taiwanese actor. The son of actor Michael Huang, Sean Huang made his film debut in 2010. He won the Golden Bell Award for Best Actor in a Miniseries or Television Film in 2011.

Selected filmography
(Sex) Appeal (2014)
10,000 Miles (2016)
Missing Johnny (2017)

References

1991 births
Living people
21st-century Taiwanese male actors
Taiwanese male film actors
Taiwanese male television actors